Musa cheesmanii is a species of wild banana (genus Musa).

References

cheesmani